Cichy (meaning "silent" in Polish) may refer to:

Cichy, Lublin Voivodeship, a village in the administrative district of Gmina Tarnogród
Cichy, Warmian-Masurian Voivodeship (Czychen), a village in the administrative district of Gmina Świętajno
Cichy (surname)

See also
Tichý (Czech and Slovak form of the same word)